In mathematics, a boxcar function is any function which is zero over the entire
real line except for a single interval where it is equal to a constant, A. The boxcar function can be expressed in terms of the uniform distribution as

As with most such discontinuous functions, there is a question of the value at the transition points. These values are probably best chosen for each individual application.

When a boxcar function is selected as the impulse response of a filter, the result is a moving average filter.

The function is named after its graph's resemblance to a boxcar, a type of railroad car.

See also
 Boxcar averager
 Rectangular function
 Step function
 Top-hat filter

References

Special functions